"Max 500" is a song by Swedish alternative rock band Kent. It was released in February 2005 as the first single from the album Du & jag döden.

The case has a sticker on front with the track list and other details. The CD is black on both sides. Lisa Miskovsky sings backing vocals on 	"Välgärningar & illdåd".

Max 500 was an illegal nightclub in Eskilstuna in the early 1990s.

Track listing

Charts

References

2005 singles
Number-one singles in Norway
Number-one singles in Sweden
Kent (band) songs
Songs written by Joakim Berg
2005 songs